WVNO-FM (106.1 FM) is a radio station broadcasting an adult contemporary format.  Licensed to Mansfield, Ohio, United States, the station serves the Mid-Ohio area.  The station is currently owned by Johnny Appleseed Broadcasting Company and features programming from Premiere Networks and Westwood One.

HD Radio
On August 20, 2018, WVNO launched a country music format on its HD2 subchannel, branded as "97.3 The Spur" (simulcast on translator W247BL 97.3 FM Mansfield).

References

External links
WVNO Facebook

VNO-FM